Palisade Preparatory School (Palisade Prep or PPS) was a public middle high school and a former College Board School, comprising grades 7–12, in Yonkers, New York, United States. It was operated by the Yonkers Public Schools since its founding in September 2008 until its closure in June 2022. At the June 14, 2022 Board of Education Stated Meeting, the school was renamed the Barack Obama School for Social Justice beginning with the 2022-23 school year.

History
Palisade Preparatory School was located in the old Yonkers High School of Commerce building (originally Longfellow Junior High School from 1930 to 1938), which became Commerce Middle School. Yonkers Public Schools closed down the middle school in June 2008 due to low academic performance, and along with the College Board, the school was founded. This school was funded by the Bill and Melinda Gates Foundation and the Michael and Susan Dell Foundation for five years.

The founding principal, Michael Angresano, stepped down as principal in June 2011, after serving for three years. Angresano's successor was Michelle P. Yazurlo, Ed.D. from 2011 until 2020. The last principal of the school was Robert P. Vicuña, Ed.D..

School theme
Originally meant as a college preparatory school due to its connection with the College Board, Palisade Prep shifted its focus starting in the 2015–16 school year with a Public Safety Academy, which offers a program for young men and women expressing an interest in one of three career pathways: Law Enforcement, Fire/Emergency Medical Services and Emergency Management.

References

External links
Palisade Preparatory School official website

Public high schools in Yonkers, New York
Public schools in Yonkers, New York
Public middle schools in Westchester County, New York